Crystal Night (Japanese: クリスタルナイト) is the second and last album by 1986 Omega Tribe, released by VAP on February 4, 1987. The album peaked at #1 on the Oricon LP Chart.

The album contains the single "Super Chance," which peaked at #2 on the Oricon Singles chart. The single, "Cosmic Love," was not included in the album, but its B-side, "I'll Never Forget You," was included.

On the 6th and 9th songs, the chorus group EVE participate in the chorus.

The song "Ipanema Rain" was named after the neighborhood Ipanema in Brazil. The song "Crystal Night" was the first song to have a full promotional video attached to it.

Track listing

Charts

Weekly charts

Year-end charts

References 

1987 albums
Omega Tribe (Japanese band) albums